Jin Mingri, who is also known as Ezra Jin, is the pastor of Zion Church of Beijing a very influential independent Chinese Christian church in Beijing, China. The church started in 2007 and soon grew to over a 1,000 worshipers. Journalist Evan Osnos said Jin has a "lively televangelist flair".

Born in Heilongjiang, he is a Korean ethnic minority in China. He is a graduate of Beijing University (BA), Nanjing Union Theological Seminary (MDiv) and Fuller Theological Seminary (DMin). Following the 1989 Tiananmen Square protests and massacre, he started attending a Three-Self Patriotic Movement church. Within a few months, he became a Christian convert. In 2018, the authorities shut down the church and put the pastor under house arrest.

References

Chinese people of Korean descent
Chinese religious leaders
Fuller Theological Seminary alumni
Peking University alumni
Living people
Year of birth missing (living people)